This page provides supplementary chemical data on difluoromethane.

Chemical data pages
Chemical data pages cleanup